Colegio Guadalaviar is an international school in Valencia, Spain. Includes the educational stages from 3 years to high school (3 to 18 years). It was founded in 1959 by a group of parents inspired by saint Josemaría Escrivá he school is regarded as one of the best schools in Comunidad Valenciana. The curriculum includes Dual Baccalaureate
. His educational project is based on personalized attention, multilingualism, innovation and collaboration with families.

Organisation 
The school is divided into three divisions—Elementary (pre-kindergarten to grade six), Middle (grades seven, and eight, nine and ten), and High School (grades eleven and twelve). The typical class has twenty-five students, with many language classes considerably smaller.

Mathematics Olympiad 

The Guadalaviar's Mathematics Olympiad is Valencia's top mathematical problem-solving competition for High School students. The first Guadalaviar's Mathematics Olympiad was held in 1992. It is sponsored by Generalitat Valenciana, City of Arts and Sciences, Valencia CF and Caixabank.

Rankings 

In 2017 Guadalaviar passed the PISA exams and the results were even better than the means obtained by the centers in Finland, which remained the best performing country overall in Europe.

Name 

It is named for Guadalaviar river, a Spanish river which has its source in the Montes Universales in the mountain ranges of the northwesternmost end of the Sistema Ibérico.

Notable alumni 
 Laura Gallego García is a Spanish author known by The Idhún's Memories

References

Educational institutions established in 1959
International schools in Spain
1959 establishments in Spain